Love Will Kill All is the eighth studio album by American metal band Bleeding Through. It is their first album since they reformed in 2018 after their four-year split, and it was released by SharpTone Records on May 25, 2018. The album sold 3,000 copies within the first week. A music video was released for the song "Set Me Free" on April 6, 2018.

Track listing

Personnel 
 Brandan Schieppati – lead vocals
 Brian Leppke – guitars
 Ryan Wombacher – bass guitar, backing vocals
 Marta Peterson – keyboards, piano, backing vocals
 Derek Youngsma – drums, percussion

Charts

References 

2018 albums
Bleeding Through albums
SharpTone Records albums